William Willoughby Cole, 3rd Earl of Enniskillen, FRS (25 January 180712 November 1886) styled by the courtesy title Viscount Cole until 1840, was an Irish palaeontologist and Conservative Member of Parliament. He also served as the first Imperial Grand Master of the Orange Order from 1866 until his death. He was Grand Master of the Grand Orange Lodge of Ireland from 1846 until his death.

Background and education
Cole was born into the Ulster branch of 'the Ascendancy', the Anglo-Irish aristocracy. He was the son of John Willoughby Cole, 2nd Earl of Enniskillen and his wife, Lady Charlotte Paget. Lord Cole was educated at Harrow and Christ Church, Oxford.  In his youth he began to devote his leisure to the study and collection of fossil fishes, with his friend Sir Philip Grey Egerton, and amassed a fine collection at Florence Court, his home just south-west of Enniskillen.  This included many specimens that were described and figured by Agassiz and Egerton. This collection was subsequently acquired by the British Museum, and now resides at the Natural History Museum, London.

Political career
Lord Enniskillen was also involved in politics and represented (as Lord Cole) Fermanagh in the House of Commons between 1831 and 1840, when he succeeded his father, to become the third Earl of Enniskillen, and entered the House of Lords as Baron Grinstead. In Dublin, he was a member of the Kildare Street Club.

Family

Lord Enniskillen married, firstly, Jane Casamaijor, daughter of James Casamaijor, in 1844, by whom he had seven children:

 John Willoughby Michael Cole, Viscount Cole (16 December 184415 April 1850)
 Lowry Cole, 4th Earl of Enniskillen (1845–1924)
 Lady Charlotte June Cole (10 May 18473 September 1933), married James Hugh Smith-Barry and had issue
 Lady Florence Mary Cole (5 August 184923 March 1924), married John Crichton, 4th Earl Erne and had issue
 The Hon. Arthur Edward Casamaijor Cole (9 March 185117 August 1908), married and had issue
 Lady Alice Elizabeth Cole (4 February 185325 August 1931), married Evelyn Ashley and had issue
 Lady Jane Evelyn Cole (21 April 185519 March 1941)

After her death in 1855 he married, secondly, The Hon. Mary Emma Brodrick, daughter of Charles Brodrick, 6th Viscount Midleton, in 1865. He died in November 1886, aged 79, and was succeeded in his titles by his second but eldest surviving son from his first marriage, Lowry. The Countess of Enniskillen died in 1896.

Notes

References 
Kidd, Charles, Williamson, David (editors). Debrett's Peerage and Baronetage (1990 edition). New York: St Martin's Press, 1990.

 Malcolmson, A. P. W. 'The Enniskillen Family, Estate and Archive'. Clogher Record 16 (2), 1998, pp. 81-122.

Attribution:

Further reading
 James, Kenneth W., Damned Nonsense! - The geological career of the third Earl of Enniskillen. Ulster Museum, Stranmillis, Belfast, 1986. .
 Tinniswood, Adrian, County Fermanagh. The National Trust, Heelis, Swindon, 1998 (revised 2006). .
 Purcell, Mark, The Big House Library in Ireland: Books in Ulster Country Houses. The National Trust, Heelis, Swindon, 2011. .

External links

1807 births
1886 deaths
Alumni of Christ Church, Oxford
Cole family (Anglo-Irish aristocracy)
Cole, William Cole, Viscount
Earls of Enniskillen
Fellows of the Royal Society
Cole, William Cole, Viscount
People educated at Harrow School
Cole, William Cole, Viscount
Cole, William Cole, Viscount
Cole, William Cole, Viscount
Cole, William Cole, Viscount
Cole, William Cole, Viscount
Enniskillen, E3
Grand Masters of the Orange Order